Ratha Paasam may refer to:

Ratha Paasam (1954 film) – Tamil film directed by R. S. Mani
Ratha Paasam (1980 film) – Tamil film directed by K. Vijayan